The 1998 Porsche Tennis Grand Prix was a women's tennis tournament played on indoor hard courts at the Filderstadt Tennis Club in Filderstadt in Germany that was part of Tier II of the 1998 WTA Tour. It was the 21st edition of the tournament and was held from 5 October until 11 October 1998. Unseeded Sandrine Testud won the singles title and earned $79,000 first-prize money.

Finals

Singles

 Sandrine Testud defeated  Lindsay Davenport 7–5, 6–3
 It was Testud's only title of the year and the 2nd of her career.

Doubles

 Lindsay Davenport /  Natasha Zvereva defeated  Anna Kournikova /  Arantxa Sánchez-Vicario 6–4, 6–2
 It was Davenport's 10th title of the year and the 41st of her career. It was Zvereva's 6th title of the year and the 79th of her career.

Prize money

References

External links
 ITF tournament edition details

Porsche Tennis Grand Prix
Porsche Tennis Grand Prix
1998 in German tennis
1990s in Baden-Württemberg
Porsch